Local elections in Taguig were held on May 13, 2019 within the Philippine general election. The voters voted for the elective local posts in the city: the mayor, vice mayor, two district representatives, and councilors, eight in each of the city's two legislative districts.

Mayoral and Vice Mayoral elections
Incumbent city mayor Lani Cayetano is term-limited after serving three consecutive terms. Running in her place is brother-in-law and former second district congressman, Lino Cayetano. Incumbent first district congressman Arnel Cerafica is also running for mayor, after completing three successive terms.

Lino Cayetano's running mate is incumbent vice mayor Ricardo "Ading" Cruz Jr., who is running for his third and final term. He is pitted against Cerafica's running mate, former second district congressman Jun Dueñas.

District representatives

1st District (Taguig-Pateros)
Incumbent Congressman Arnel Cerafica is term-limited and is running for Mayor. His brother, Allan Cerafica, competed for the position against former Foreign Affairs Secretary Alan Peter Cayetano, also a former representative of Taguig–Pateros when it was a lone district from 1998 to 2007.

2nd District
Incumbent Congresswoman Pia Cayetano has opted to run for senator. Competing in her place is her sister-in-law and term-limited incumbent Mayor Lani Cayetano, who faced former Councilor Michelle Anne Gonzales.

City Council

By ticket

Bida Tayo Taguig

Team AMC

By district

1st District
Incumbent Councilors Rodil Marcelino and Carlito Ogalinola are term-limited and did not vie for any position.

Incumbent and former councilors in italic.

|-bgcolor=black
|colspan=8|

2nd District
Incumbent councilor Jojo Eron is term-limited. His wife and former councilor Marisse Balina-Eron will run in his place.

In 2018, Councilor Ric Paul Jordan was arrested for theft and drug possession charges in Parañaque. He was replaced in the city council by Mayfe V. Mañosca, who did not participate in the election.

Incumbent and former councilors in italic.

|-bgcolor=black
|colspan=8|

References

2019 Philippine local elections
May 2019 events in the Philippines
Elections in Taguig
2019 elections in Metro Manila